The Hatogaya Dam is a gravity dam on the Shō River about  south of Shirakawa in Gifu Prefecture, Japan. It was constructed between 1954 and 1956. The dam has an associated 43 MW hydroelectric power station which was commissioned in 1956. Of the nine dams on the Shō River it is the eighth furthest downstream.

See also

Tsubawara Dam – downstream
Miboro Dam – upstream

References

Dams in Gifu Prefecture
Gravity dams
Dams completed in 1956
Dams on the Shō River
Hydroelectric power stations in Japan